The Verbandsliga Hessen-Nord, until 2008 named Landesliga Hessen-Nord, is currently the sixth tier of the German football league system. Until the introduction of the 3. Liga in 2008 it was the fifth tier of the league system, and until the introduction of the Regionalligas in 1994 it was the fourth tier.

Overview 
The Verbandsliga Hessen-Nord was formed in 1965 as the Landesliga Hessen-Nord, a tier four feeder league to the then Amateurliga Hessen.

The winner of the Verbandsliga Hessen-Nord automatically qualifies for the Hessenliga, the runners-up needs to compete with the runners-up of Verbandsliga Hessen-Süd and Verbandsliga Hessen-Mitte and the 15th placed team of the Hessenliga for another promotion spot.

The Verbandsliga Hessen-Nord is fed by the Gruppenliga Hessen-Fulda, Hessen-Kassel Gruppe 1 and Hessen-Kassel Gruppe 2. The winners of those divisions are automatically promoted to the Verbandsliga, the runners-up play-off for another promotion spot.

Up until 1973 it was common for teams to move between Landesligen, resulting in the fact that some teams have won titles in two different Landesligen. This practice has since stopped.

The region covered by the Verbandsliga Hessen-Nord is not traditionally a part of the Southern German Football Association, it only became part of it with the formation of the state of Hesse in 1945.

Along with the renaming of the Oberliga Hessen to Hessenliga in 2008, the Landesliga was renamed Verbandsliga Hessen-Nord.

League champions 
The league champions:

Verbandsliga 
The league champions since the renaming of the league in 2008:

Landesliga 
The league champions until the renaming of the league in 2008:

 KSV Hessen Kassel hold the absolute record for Landesliga titles in Hessen, having won six, all in the Landesliga Nord. Five of those however were won by their reserve team.

Additionally promoted teams 
These clubs were promoted to the Oberliga after finishing second and third in the league:

References

Sources 
 Deutschlands Fußball in Zahlen,  DSFS
 Süddeutschlands Fußballgeschichte in Tabellenform 1897-1988  by Ludolf Hyll
 Die Deutsche Liga-Chronik 1945-2005  DSFS 2006

External links 
 Hessischer Fußball-Verband – HFV 

 

Hessen-Nord
Football competitions in Hesse
1965 establishments in West Germany